Ernest Tubb Sings Hank Williams is an album by American country singer Ernest Tubb, released in 1968 (see 1968 in music). It is a tribute to the songs of country singer-songwriter Hank Williams.

Track listing
All songs by Hank Williams unless otherwise noted.
"Hey, Good Lookin'"
"I'm So Lonesome I Could Cry"
"Take These Chains from My Heart" (Fred Rose, Hy Heath)
"I Can't Help It (If I'm Still in Love with You)"
"A Mansion on the Hill" (Hank Williams, Fred Rose)
"Mind Your Own Business"
"Your Cheatin' Heart"
"Cold, Cold Heart"
"Window Shopping" (Marcel Joseph)
"Someday You'll Call My Name" (Jean Branch, Eddie Hill)
"I Could Never Be Ashamed of You"

Personnel
Ernest Tubb – vocals, guitar
Jerry Shook – guitar, bass
Grady Martin – guitar
Steve Chapman – guitar
Buddy Charleton – pedal steel guitar
Jack Drake – bass
Billy Pfender – drums
Hargus "Pig" Robbins – piano

Chart positions

References

Ernest Tubb albums
1968 albums
Albums produced by Owen Bradley
Decca Records albums